115th Street–Morgan Park is one of two Metra railroad stations in the Morgan Park neighborhood of Chicago, Illinois, along the Beverly Branch of the Rock Island District Line. In Metra's zone-based fare system, 115th Street is in zone C. As of 2018, 115th Street–Morgan Park was the 176th busiest of Metra's 236 non-downtown stations, with an average of 136 weekday boardings.

As of 2022, 115th Street–Morgan Park is served by 20 trains in each direction on weekdays, by 10 inbound trains and 11 outbound trains on Saturdays, and by eight trains in each direction on Sundays.

Parking is available along the west side of the tracks on South Hale Avenue between Edmaire Street and north of 116th Street. It is also available on small on-street lots along the north side of 115th Street between the tracks and Church Street. No bus connections are available.

The train station building was damaged by a fire in May 2017 and subsequently demolished. Officials ruled that arson was the cause of the fire.

References

External links

Station from 115th Street from Google Maps Street View

Metra stations in Chicago
Former Chicago, Rock Island and Pacific Railroad stations
Railway stations in the United States opened in 1892